The Marylebone Cricket Club tour of Australia in 1958-59 under the captaincy of Peter May was its twelfth since it took official control of overseas tours in 1903-1904. The touring team played as England in the 1958–59 Ashes series against Australia, but as the MCC in all other games. In all there were 20 matches; 5 Test matches (which they lost 4-0), 12 other First Class matches (which they won 4-0) and 3 minor matches (which they won 3-0). It was billed as the strongest MCC team ever to tour Australia and dominated the early matches, and its heavy defeat in the Test series was seen as one of the great upsets in cricket.

Travelling to Australia
The MCC team arrived on the Iberia in Fremantle on 13 October and after a rest day found their three days practice severely reduced due to heavy rain.

Western Australia vs MCC

This pencil-slim youngster bowled off-spinners in the first innings with a highly suspect and jerky action...but no one bothered much about him because of his comparatively modest success. The balloon really went up in the second innings when he used the new ball...I thought he looked less like a chucker when bowling quick but the M.C.C. were incensed.
Keith Miller
Unlike previous (and subsequent) tours they did not face a match against a local Country XI, but went straight into a First Class game against Western Australia. Bush games were unpopular with the touring sides, although the Australian Board of Control saw them as a good advertisement for cricket and to be fair they were good practice. The home captain Ken Meuleman won the toss and put the tourists in on a fast wicket, covered with grass and freshened by the rain, though it proved less problematic than it looked. The batting was dominated by Tom Graveney, who had made 111 in his last innings in Australia and now hit 177 not out. He carefully played himself in on the first day, but struck the ball in fine form on the second. Only Peter May kept him company for long, cracking his first ball through the covers for four and nearly decapitating a spectator with a six into the member's enclosure. They added 91 for the third wicket and Graveney and Colin Cowdrey (28) 97 for the fourth. John Rutherford was brought on as seventh bowler and took 3/12 with his leg-spin to wrap up the innings as England collapsed from 345/7 to 351 all out. Graveney struck again in the Western Australian innings, catching Rutherford off the first ball from Fred Trueman (3/42). While his luck was in he visited the Gloucester Park Trotting Meeting that evening and was not disappointed with his wagers. With Peter Loader (3/40), Frank Tyson (2/59) and Tony Lock (2/46) all chipping in with wickets the hosts were out for 221 on the third morning, Bobby Simpson making 60 despite a bad start and Meuleman 42. In their second innings the MCC again had trouble with Keith Slater who took 4/33 - his best bowling in First Class cricket - and they collapsed to 44/4, with May out for a duck.  Although Slater was bowling with a bent arm no complaint was made. Cowdrey (65 not out) and Trevor Bailey (34 not out) made an unbeaten stand of 102 and May declared on 146/4, 276 runs ahead. In a three-day game there was little chance of a win as the state players tried to impress the selectors with a responsible innings and the tourists could not afford a demoralising loss. John Rutherford was left unbeaten on 77 and Lock took 2/26, conceding only 72 runs off his 42 eight-ball overs in the match, leaving Western Australia on 124/3. After the complaints about Len Hutton's time wasting on the previous tour May was determined to keep the overs ticking over and succeeded in doing so.

Western Australia Combined XI vs MCC

Until the 1970s it was the practice to strengthen state sides with Test cricketers so that the Australian selectors could see them play and to provide more games for the tourists. Colin McDonald of Victoria, Norm O'Neill of New South Wales, Ken Mackay of Queensland were flown over and such was O'Neill's popularity that a record 17,921 people came to watch him bat on the second day, the biggest crowd at the WACA since 1932. Keith Miller wrote "Not since the days of Bradman had one player so absorbed the limelight". Willie Watson was having knee surgery, Frank Tyson had lumbago and Roy Swetman, Tom Graveney and Tony Lock were dropped so that the other 11 players could have a game. The MCC won the toss and chose to bat on a wicket that had been dried out by a week's sunshine since their last game. Peter Richardson and Arthur Milton were out playing strokes, unused to the pace and bounce of Australian wickets, Raman Subba Row was unlucky and the tourists were soon 33/3. As many times before it was up to captain Peter May and vice-captain Colin Cowdrey to set things right after a shaky start and they had added 134 runs when May pulled a knee ligament and retired hurt on 68. Cowdrey played carefully for 78 and when Trevor Bailey was yorked by Raymond Strauss (5/99) May returned, using Bailey as a runner. He added 92 with Evans (55) and made 113 when they both got themselves out to allow the tail wag its way to 349. With May and Bailey unwell Cowdrey brought Jim Laker (2/55) in to float the ball into a strong wind once Brian Statham (2/35) finished his opening spell. O'Neill came in after the first wicket and batted wonderfully, hitting Milton for 23 off an over and making 104 on the Monday morning despite Ken Mackay making him wait for an hour by taking a single off the last ball of six overs in succession. Only 110 runs were made in the day as Laker bowled very tightly and removed O'Neill. Peter Loader (4/56) ran through the lower order as the Combined XI fell from 187/3 to 227/8 and 260 all out. Richardson failed again and the wicketless Fred Trueman went in as nightwatchman to hit 53 before Bailey (71 not out) and Cowdrey (100 not out) batted out the day to draw the game on 257/4.

South Australia vs MCC

The MCC tour party left Western Australia for South Australia with several concerns. Their 16-man squad had been reduced by knee injuries to captain Peter May and batsman Willie Watson. On the plus side Tom Graveney, Colin Cowdrey and Peter May all made centuries and Brian Statham, Peter Loader, Jim Laker, and Tony Lock had taken wickets. South Australia were not a strong team at this time and none of their players were certain of a Test place. Vice-captain Colin Cowdrey captained the MCC in place of May, but lost the toss to Colin Pinch who chose to bat. Les Favell (19) and Gavin Stevens (38) knocked up 43 runs in 52 minutes against Frank Tyson bowling downwind with Fred Trueman at fast-medium pace at the other end. Tyson was taken off and when Trueman was given the wind he bowled Favell. He was joined by Jim Laker (5/31) who amazed Clarrie Grimmett by getting the ball to turn on the first day, the great Australian leg-spinner had never been able to do this until the third day at the Adelaide Oval, and Tony Lock (0/40) was brought on. After lunch Tyson dismissed John Lill (34) and Johnny Martin for a duck, the last six wickets fell for 26 runs and South Australia were out for 165. Fast bowler John Drennan had injured himself batting, but opened the bowling at medium pace without any luck. Peter Richardson held the team together with 88 and added 102 with Tom Graveney (41), but the left-arm wrist spinner Johnny Martin was brought on for his state debut having moved west from New South Wales. Like Arthur Mailey he "bowled like a millionaire" and worked his way through the MCC batting with old-fashioned bowling figures of 7/110. Trueman hit the bowlers for 4212446 in his eleven-minute 23 before he was caught and the innings ended on 245, a lead of only 80. With the wind behind him again Tyson beat Stevens with pace to catch him leg before, but the South Australians were "Lakered and Locked" as the Surrey spinners took 5/70 and 4/65, only Martin with two sixes in his 37 made a fight of it and they were out for 194 on the third day. Needing 115 to win Richardson (40) and Milton (63 not out) opened with 100 for the first wicket and the tourists won by 9 wickets that evening in extra time to give the players the fourth day off.

Victoria vs MCC

Continuing east the MCC team came to Melbourne to play Victoria, a stronger proposition than South Australia. Their captain was the Australian opener Colin McDonald and their wicket-keeper Len Maddocks and the two young bowlers Lindsay Kline and Ian Meckiff who had done well on the recent tour of South Africa. With Peter May still resting his knee vice-captain Colin Cowdrey was in charge, winning the toss and electing to bat on a good wicket. Fred Trueman and Frank Tyson were rested and after Adelaide it was decided to use both spin bowlers again even though it was thought only one would be used the Tests. Peter Richardson was caught off Meckiff's third ball, whose action caused immediate interest. "He bowled fast left-arm over the wicket with one or two really very quick ones which had the suspicion of a throw about them". Arthur Milton gloved a dropped catch going for hook, but settled down with his Gloucestershire team-mate Tom Graveney who was in fine form. "Long Tom" was out l.b.w. trying to pull a ball that stayed low with the score on 54, but Milton (116) added 197 with Raman Subba Row (83). McDonald brought on Kline (3/126), but his slow left-arm wrist-spin deliveries were expensive and failed to turn. Meckiff removed Subba Row and Colin Cowdrey was run out by Ian Huntington after he stepped forward after an l.b.w. appeal. Tony Lock came in as nightwatchman and belted 44 in under an hour, which was appreciated by the 26,000 crowd more than Trevor Bailey's slow innings. Everybody made double figures except the first and last batsmen and the MCC totalled 396, Meckiff (4/69) being the best of the Victorian bowlers. Brian Statham and Peter Loader opened the bowling, but after "George" bowled opener Neil Crompton Laker and Lock were brought on and each took a wicket, Laker getting McDonald for 53 and Lock Allen Aylett for 23. After the rest day Victoria resumed on 119/3 and Statham demonstrated why his motto was "if they miss, I hit" catching one wicket leg before and clean bowling another five in his 7/47, including Ian Huntington for 73. When asked about the slow pitch he replied "Well, if it's slow you’ve got to bowl faster" With Victoria out for 252 the MCC had a lead of 144 and went for quick runs. Milton was run out by Huntington when sent back by Richardson (40), but Tom Graveney (78 not out) took the score to 149/3 and Cowdrey declared on the fourth morning after the two minutes silence for Remembrance Day. Victoria needed 296 runs in four hours and to McDonald's credit he went for the win, top-scoring with 62. Statham had no luck, Laker and Loader were ill with sun-stroke, but Tony Lock took 6/70, helped by three catches in a row by Milton. He managed to find turn and bounce and won the game by taking two wickets in the last over of the day. The tourists thought Ian Meckiff was a thrower, but not a very good one, no complaint was made and the MCC lost the chance ensure that he did not play in the Tests without too much fuss.

New South Wales vs MCC

The next stop was in Sydney to play the champions New South Wales. Ian Craig was captain of Australia as well as New South Wales, which had won the Sheffield Shield 8 times since the war, the last 4 in succession, and would go on to win another 5. On a wicket known to take spin Jim Laker was unfit to play, as was Peter Loader, Willie Watson, still recovering from his knee surgery, Fred Trueman had a cold, but volunteered to play and Peter May had recovered sufficiently to captain the team. Craig won the toss and batted on a sunny day on a good wicket. After Sid Carroll was bowled by a Trueman outswinger in the first over Jim Burke made a ponderous 104 and Neil Harvey a somewhat quicker 149 to finish the day on 243/1. Taking the new ball the next day Trueman (2/62) had Harvey caught off a skyer, which brought in Norm O'Neill, who stroked his way to 84 not out. The other batsman went for runs and Lock (4/121) picked up the wickets of Burke, Craig (who looked very unwell) and Brian Booth for ducks and Alan Davidson for 8. Richie Benaud was caught and bowled off a Trevor Bailey long-hop and Craig declared on 391/7 before O'Neill could complete his century. The MCC openers were soon out; Arthur Milton (10) bowled by the huge Gordon Rorke (1/15) and Peter Richardson (21), caught by Harvey off Peter Philpott. Peter May (29) and Tom Graveney (36) saw out the second day, but the next highest scorer was last man Brian Statham with 27 as the New South Wales leg-spinners Richie Benaud (5/48) and Philpott (4/87) worked their way through the order, leaving "Barnacle Bailey" on 14 not out in a total of 177. The improvement of Benaud's bowling since his great tour of South Africa was evident just two weeks before the first Test. Craig enforced the follow on, but the MCC recovered as Richardson (87) and Milton (81) put on 170 for the first wicket, easily their best effort of the tour. Philpott took 5 catches in the match and removed both openers, one off Davidson (2/37) and the other off Benaud (2/84) and the MCC slumped to 217/4. Tom Graveney (59), Roy Swetman (52) and Colin Cowdrey (42 not out) played out the last day and the tourists ended on a comfortable 356/4. Strangely Swetman, using his feet more than the other batsman, played the spinners better than the other batsmen, who were struggling. After the match the MCC announced that John Mortimore would be sent out to reinforce the team as it appeared that the pitches would take spin. He was also an all-rounder who could strengthen the lower order batting and his arrival would allow the team to rest Laker and Lock in the state games.

Australian XI vs MCC

The MCC remained at Sydney to play an Australian XI, this was a team of Test hopefuls strengthened by the presence of a few old hands and led by the prospective Australian captain Neil Harvey following Ian Craig's resignation due to ill-health. It was the custom to play the six batsmen due to be picked for the First Test, but to only use bowlers on the edge of the Test scene. Peter May won the toss and like Craig in the previous match opted to bat first, only to come at 40/2 which quickly became 40/3 thanks to Barry Fisher (3/59) and Raymond Strauss (4/77) who swung the ball in the heavy atmosphere. After a shaky start himself May settled and made runs with Tom Graveney (70), but a late order collapse in the last session reduced them from 189/3 to 290/7 at stumps, the captain 113 not out. May carried the score to 319 when he was last out for 140, a fine captain's innings. This looked better when the Australian XI crashed to 12/3, May ruining out Gavin Stevens, Peter Loader bowling captain Neil Harvey for a duck and Fred Trueman dismissing Norm O'Neill with a terrific yorker that bruised his foot and caught him l.b.w. Colin McDonald steadied the ship helped by the front foot "English-style" batting of Peter Burge before Loader (4/23) bowled him for 49 and Bobby Simpson for 2. Jim Laker (4/52) trapped all-rounder Johnny Martin for a duck as they lost 4 wickets for 4 runs. The tail wagged for another 47 runs, but the Australian XI was out for 128. With tired bowlers and an unfit Trueman May failed to enforce the follow on and batted 191 runs ahead. Arthur Milton was the first to go, but Peter Richardson made 52 and Raman Subba Row (68 not out) dug himself in. Peter May played himself in before lunch, then attacked the Australian bowling with "a welter of strokes", He struck Fisher for 42421 off successive balls to take him to 97 and brought up his century with a magnificent cover-drive off Strauss. In the last over before tea he brought up his 100 runs in a session and won £A500 from the Sydney newspaper The Daily Telegraph. May shared half the money with the team and used the other half to throw a party for the two teams and the press. The England captain rarely allowed himself the liberty of cutting the bowling to ribbons, but many thought this was one of his finest displays. He declared on 257/3 when he was bowled by Fisher after tea for 114, leaving the Australian XI 449 to win. Subba Row dropped McDonald off Loader, who retired with a strained Achilles tendon, which allowed his substitute Willie Watson to play his first cricket of the tour. McDonald did not survive long, retiring hurt for 5 with a torn hamstring. Stevens (33) and Harvey (38) took the first wicket partnership to 57 when Trueman bowled the opener and caught O'Neill off Tony Lock. Making the ball bite and turn off Trueman's footmarks Lock took 6/29 as Australia crashed to 98/7, Laker (2/30) snapped up the last two wickets and the Australian XI were out for 103 on the last ball of the third day to lose by the crushing margin of 345 runs. The Surrey duo had now taken 44 wickets (17.86) on the tour and put people on mind of the ditty "Here lie the Ashes of '56, skittled by Laker for next to nix". The Australian selectors Sir Donald Bradman and Jack Ryder looked distinctly unhappy as they watched the game and it probably cost Neil Harvey the Australian captaincy, instead they gave it to Richie Benaud.

Queensland vs MCC

Travelling north to Brisbane the tourists found a storm brewing and the weather cool, but heavy. Peter May won the toss and chose to bat on a green wicket, but only three overs were played before the rain came. When they resumed the opener Willie Watson was caught by Wally Grout off the Queensland captain Ray Lindwall, who swung the ball at his pleasure in the heavy atmosphere, taking 5/57 as England collapsed to 39/4. Raman Subba Row (51) and Trevor Bailey (33) rescued the innings, but the leg-spinner Wal Walmsley (2/34) bowled Subba Row and Ken Mackay (3/4) removed Roy Swetman and Frank Tyson and the MCC were out for 151. Queensland were 30/1 overnight and batted poorly the next day, making only 105 runs in a full day's play as John Mortimore took 21-8-26-0 in the day, Jim Laker 12-3-19-1 and Trevor Bailey 21-8-28-1. No wonder crowds flocked to see Norm O'Neill's attacking strokeplay. On the last day Queensland made an effort to make more runs, but still took 501 minutes to make 210 with Statham taking 3/43 and Laker 4/27, but Mortimore was hit for 38 runs off his last 8 overs without a wicket and Ron Archer top scored with 83. The ball broke Raman Subba Row's wrist when fielding, another injury that removed him from contention just after he had made three fifties in three games. The MCC collapsed again to 41/4 as Lindwall (2/16) removed both openers and Walmsley (2/25) the out of form Colin Cowdrey and Trevor Bailey. Peter May and Roy Swetman added 30 unbeaten runs when the rain returned to finish the game.

First Test - Brisbane

See Main Article - 1958-59 Ashes series

Tasmania vs MCC

The MCC had announced immediately before First Test that the Cambridge and Sussex all-rounder Ted Dexter would be flown in as a reinforcement and he arrived in Sydney in time join the team on its way to Tasmania. Willie Watson was brought back as an opener instead of Arthur Milton. The first day was lost to rain, but Peter May won the toss, batted and saw Richardson (56) and Watson (30) add 72 against the weak Tasmanian attack. Dexter made 38 and May 80 (including 2 sixes) when he declared on 229/7. Fred Trueman (3/36) had recovered from his back illness by drinking copious amounts of lemon juice and he and Frank Tyson reduced the home team to 18/3 before stumps. On the next drizzle-filled day they reached 94/4 thanks to 52 not out from left-hander Ray Stokes before rain finally stopped play.

Tasmania Combined XI vs MCC

To bolster the Tasmanian team Colin McDonald of Victoria was shipped over with Jim Burke, Norm O'Neill and Peter Philpott of New South Wales. Terence Cowley won the toss and put the MCC in to bat rather than face Frank Tyson, Fred Trueman, Peter Loader and Ted Dexter on a green wicket in English-style conditions. Willie Watson (43) and Arthur Milton (83) put on 99 for the first wicket, Peter May (80) and the out-of-form Colin Cowdrey (72) 123 for the fifth wicket and the M.C.C batted into the second day before declaring on 384/9, Cowley taking 5/92. McDonald used a heavy bat and made 104 before he threw his wicket away in what was obviously going to be a draw. No other batsman made 30 and the wickets were shared around five of the seven bowlers used, Tyson (3/60) being the best, though Trueman took a good one-handed catch off Mortimore to dismiss O'Neill for 20. The tourists batted out the last afternoon, Watson making 42 and Graveney 52 in their 162/4.

South Australia vs MCC

The MCC returned to Adelaide to play South Australia and were put in on Christmas Eve by Les Favell on a lively wicket freshened up by the rain that delayed the start. The old Australian fast bowler Tim Wall could hardly believe his eyes as the ball leapt up at the batsmen where normally it rarely rose above the stumps. Richardson, Watson, Cowdrey (the captain for this match) and Dexter were out for 34/4 to the long drag of Peter Trethewey (1/33) and Alan Hitchcox (3/48). Arthur Milton stuck in for 37, was hit repeatedly by the ball, broke his finger and Tom Graveney made 54. Tony Lock added 43 before he was out to a juggled caught and bowled by Leon Hill (2/55), which the umpire thought he had under control. Christmas Day was a rest day, but the MCC resumed on 180/7 on Boxing Day, and the reserve wicket-keeper Roy Swetman impressed with 41, having made several useful innings on the tour. Fred Trueman belted 39 and John Mortimore 17 of the last 20 runs when they were out for 276. With the wicket drying and better for batting Ted Dexter (2/45) had removed the openers Les Favell and Gavin Stevens after Frank Tyson left the field because of stomach trouble. They started the third day on 110/3, but John Lill (86) was the only man to pass 30 as "Fiery Fred" Trueman took 5/46 and they were out for 223. Wickets continue to tumble with the 19-year-old Brian Hurn taking 5/62 with Willie Watson holding the fort with 40, but the tourists were 110/7 at the end of the Saturday. With Sunday providing a second rest day Swetman (76) returned before a crowd of 12,000 to raise the total to 195/9 batting as if in a charity match. Cowdrey declared when he was out to leave South Australia 249 runs to win in 195 minutes. The started well with Les Favell (52) and David Harris (30) taking the score to 78/1 after Tyson and Swetman ran out Stevens for a duck, but collapsed to Trueman (4/33), who reduced them to 102/6, and the spinners Lock, Mortimore and Graveney ran through the overs to leave South Australia 138/9 at stumps.

Second Test - Melbourne

See Main Article - 1958-59 Ashes series

Third Test - Sydney

See Main Article - 1958-59 Ashes series

Victoria vs MCC

Peter May took a well-deserved holiday with his fiancée, though the press did not think so, and Colin Cowdrey led the team against the weak Victorian team. He lost the toss and was forced to field in the 109 °F/43 °C heat and limited the fast bowlers Frank Tyson, Fred Trueman and Peter Loader to two over spells. Victoria did quite well and reached 270/5 in the day. A 21-year-old Bill Lawry opened the batting and made a slow 24 until he was bowled by Ted Dexter, the footballer Neil Crompton hit 73, Lindsay Hassett's nephew John Shaw 94 and Jack Potter 47. Trueman took 5/42 to dismiss Crompton and Shaw and returned in the morning to wrap up the innings for 286. The MCC responded poorly with 31/4, but Colin Cowdrey stroked 84 and Willie Watson 141 in a stand of 169. Watson looked much like his old self and batted with the tail, especially John Mortimore (32) and they finished on 313, the paceman Colin Guest taking 3/39. Victoria struggled in their second innings as Tyson (3/40) and Loader (3/29) found their form. Only Crompton (64) passed 22 and they were all out for 180. The MCC players were helped when the temperature dropped to 89 °F/32 °C half-way through the day. While knocking off the 156/1 to win Arthur Milton received a nasty ball on his glove which re-fractured his broken finger and he retired hurt for 35. Peter Richardson made 65 and 120 was added before the first wicket fell. Raman Subba Row and Ted Dexter both made 21 not out and the MCC won by 9 wickets.

New South Wales vs MCC

Peter May rejoined the team when they came back to Sydney to replay New South Wales, by far the strongest state side and the match was almost played at Test level. New South Wales were sent in to bat by May on a humid day with the ball swinging and patches on the wicket thanks to poor covering against the recent rain. Frank Tyson (4/55) and Brian Statham (4/36), the new ball partnership of 1954–55, showed that they could still be very dangerous. Roy Swetman dropped Watson in the first over from Tyson, but caught him off Statham for a duck. Norm O'Neill was hit on the elbow by a rising Tyson delivery and retired hurt on 37/2. Neil Harvey made another 92 and fought back with fellow left-hander Neil Marks (42) as they took the score past 150 without further loss, but Tyson came off a short run at fast-medium pace and removed Harvey, Marks, Grahame Thomas and Richie Benaud as they crashed to 171/6 before stumps. O'Neill returned at the start of the new day, but was l.b.w. to Trevor Bailey (2/40) and Statham removed the tail and New South Wales were out for 215. Gordon Rorke (4/57) removed Peter Richardson l.b.w. first ball and Tom Graveney for 14 and generated great pace off his short run, but his long drag left him only 19 yards from the batsman when he bowled and he was very difficult to play. Trevor Bailey was hit repeatedly by Rorke, but stuck in for 54 and Peter May made a powerful 136 as they added 179 for the third wicket. The captain saw off Rorke and attacked the spinners, hitting the New South Wales captain Richie Benaud for six over mid-on and cracking drives through the covers with such ferocity that four fielders could not stop him hitting the boundary. May was 99 not out on the Saturday evening and returned on the Monday, but without the same certainty. Bailey went down the pitch to Jim Burke (1/30), missed and was stumped miles out of his ground, but the crowd shouted that Burke ought to be given a coconut because he shied the ball. Rorke caught May (136) with a beautiful ball that swung from leg to hit off stump and had Willie Watson leg before, then Benaud (5/83) spun through the tail to give him 50 wickets in the season and the MCC were out for 303. There was just time for New South Wales to reach 44/0 when the rain washed out the third and fourth days.

Fourth Test - Adelaide

See Main Article - 1958-59 Ashes series

Victoria Country vs MCC

After losing the Ashes in Adelaide the MCC team played three one day games. These were not limited overs cricket in the modern sense, but each side played one innings in the day and the first team could declare early to give it time to bowl out the opposition. This was not required in the first game at Wangaratta, Victoria when the Country XI were dismissed for 31 thanks to Peter Loader (5/17), Jim Laker (2/4) and Fred Trueman (1/8). Ted Dexter was out for 8, but Peter Richardson (22) and Raman Subba Row (40) made the runs for a 9 wicket victory. The MCC continued to entertain the crowd and get some batting practice; May made 56, Watson 38, Graveney 50 and Mortimore 50, the Country team using 10 bowlers and Thomlinson taking 3/60 before they ended on 308/8.

Southern New South Wales vs MCC

Ian Meckiff had destroyed their batting lineup in the just-completed second Test and their bad luck continued when two of their players were injured in a car smash on their journey up to Wagga from Melbourne. I don't really think they wanted to play this match at all.
Max Rudd
The team proceeded to Wagga Wagga, New South Wales for a second Country game and the opposition again batted first and on a wicket taking spin Laker (4/22), Lock (2/22), Mortimore (2/17) and Subba Row (1/9) dismissed them for 117. The MCC won by 7 wickets and batted on again to make 260/8 with Richardson making 79, Watson 63 and Mortimore 44 and John Stuckings took 3/96.

Prime Minister's XI vs MCC

Prime Minister Sir Robert Menzies was a keen cricket fan and the match between his Prime Minister's XI and the touring team was one of the social highlights of the tour with an official reception the night before the match. Cricketers can become jaded over official functions and endless speeches as the tour progresses, but Menzies was a marvellous after-dinner speaker and proved to be highly entertaining. Five Australian captains graced his team; Lindsay Hassett, Ian Johnson, Arthur Morris, Ian Craig and Ray Lindwall as did the all-rounder Sam Loxton and a Victorian wicket-keeper called Les Botham. They batted first and the opener Morris hit 14 boundaries in his 79 and Brian James, a New South Wales Country player hit 5 sixes in his 88 before retiring hurt. Tom Graveney took 2/38 with his leg-spin and Jim Laker 2/61. They declared on 288/7 off 38 eight-ball overs in two hours and thirty-five minutes, leaving the MCC roughly the same number of overs in slightly less time. Peter Richardson was out for a duck to Lindwall, Ted Dexter thrashed 76 before hitting his wicket and Colin Cowdrey struck 101 runs in 84 minutes with 10 boundaries to win the match by four wickets. He batted on for his century before he was caught by Hassett off Morris (4/46), who ran through the lower order with his part-time leg-spin and they were all out for 332.

Fifth Test - Melbourne

See Main Article - 1958-59 Ashes series

Tour First Class Averages
source
As was the convention of the time gentleman amateurs have their initials in front of their surname and professional players have their initials after their name, if used at all.

References

Bibliography
 
 Keith Miller, Cricket From the Grandstand, Oldbourne, 1959
 E.W. Swanton, Swanton in Australia, with MCC 1946-1975, Fontana, 1977

Annual reviews
 Playfair Cricket Annual 1959
 Wisden Cricketers' Almanack 1960

Further reading
 
 
 
 Ashley Brown, The Pictorial History of Cricket, Bison Books, 1988
 Mark Browning, Richie Benaud: Cricketer, Captain, Guru, Kangaroo Press, 1996
 Robert Coleman, Seasons in the Sun: the Story of the Victorian Cricket Association, Hargreen Publishing, 1993.
 Cris Freddi, The Guinness Book of Cricket Blunders, Guinness Publishing, 1996
 Bill Frindall, The Wisden Book of Test Cricket 1877-1978, Wisden, 1979
 David Frith, Pageant of Cricket, The Macmillan Company of Australia, 1987
 Tom Graveney with Norman Giller, The Ten Greatest Test Teams, Sidgewick & Jackson, 1988
 Ken Kelly and David Lemmon, Cricket Reflections : Five Decades of Cricket Photographs, Heinemann, 1985
 Alban George Moyes, Benaud & Co: The story of the Tests, 1958-1959, Angus & Robertson, 1959
 E.W. Swanton (ed), The Barclays World of Cricket, Collins, 1986
 Fred Trueman, As It Was, The Memoirs of Fred Trueman, Pan Books, 2004
 
 Bernard Whimpress, Chuckers: A history of throwing in Australian cricket, Elvis Press, 2004.
 Bob Willis and Patrick Murphy, Starting with Grace, Stanley Paul, 1986

1958 in Australian cricket
1958 in English cricket
1959 in Australian cricket
1959 in English cricket
Australian cricket seasons from 1945–46 to 1969–70
English cricket tours of Australia
International cricket competitions from 1945–46 to 1960
Australia 1958-59